Victor Chukwuekezie Igbonefo  (born 10 October 1985) is a professional footballer who plays as a centre-back for and captains Liga 1 club Persib Bandung. Born in Nigeria, he represents the Indonesia national team.

Club career

Early career
Igbonefo started his career by joining Nigerdock Soccer Academy in Nigeria. In 2003, He signed his first professional contract for Lagos based club, First Bank. He made 18 league appearances with the club before leaving in 2004.

Persipura Jayapura
In 2005, Igbonefo signed for Indonesian league giant, Persipura Jayapura. On his first season with the club, he won the 2005 Indonesian League, after defeating Persija Jakarta 3–2 in the final. Igbonefo became a key player for Persipura in their campaign to win the league in 2008–09 and 2010–11 respectively, he also formed a solid partnership in the heart of defence with Bio Paulin. On 7 October 2009, Igbonefo helped Persipura to win the 2009 Indonesian Community Shield after defeating Sriwijaya 3–1 at Andi Mattalatta Stadium.

Pelita Jaya
On 12 October 2011, it was announced that Igbonefo has joined Pelita Jaya, two-days after he was naturalized as Indonesian citizen. He only stayed a season, making 31 appearances and scoring 5 goals.

On 6 August 2012, Igbonefo was loaned out to Thai Premier League club Chiangrai United. He was loaned with teammate Greg Nwokolo until October 2012. During his short loan spell, Igbonefo made 12 appearances and scoring a goal.

Arema Cronus
During the 2013 season, Igbonefo helped Arema Cronus finish as league runners-up. On 25 February 2014, Igbonefo scored his first goal for Arema Cronus, in a 1–1 draw against Selangor in the 2014 AFC Cup group stage match tie.

On 28 July 2015, Igbonefo returned to Thailand, by signing a loan deal for Osotspa Samut Prakan, he was given the number 30 shirt. He was signed by the team, to strengthen them in the second half of the 2015 season.

Navy
On 2 January 2016, It was announced that Igbonefo has joined Thai League 1 club, Royal Navy. On 20 July 2016, He scored an equaliser in the 90th-minute to help Navy hold BEC Tero Sasana 1-1. In his only season with the club, Igbonefo recorded 29 appearances and scored 2 goals, with his team finishing 14th in the league.

International career
The Football Association of Indonesia (PSSI) announced that Igbonefo has been officially naturalised on 10 October 2011. He made his debut for the Indonesia national football team in the 2015 AFC Asian Cup qualification campaign against Saudi Arabia on 23 March 2013.

Career statistics

Club

International

Honours

Persipura Jayapura
Liga Indonesia: 2005
Indonesia Super League: 2008–09, 2010–11
Indonesian Community Shield: 2009

Arema Cronus
East Java Governor Cup: 2013
Menpora Cup: 2013
Indonesian Inter Island Cup: 2014–15

Indonesia
 AFF Championship runner-up: 2020

Individual
 Menpora Cup Best Eleven: 2021

References

External links
 
 

1986 births
Living people
Footballers from Enugu
Indonesian footballers
Indonesia international footballers
Nigerian footballers
Igbo sportspeople
Nigerian emigrants to Indonesia
Indonesian people of Nigerian descent
Naturalised citizens of Indonesia
Indonesian Super League-winning players
Indonesian Premier Division players
Liga 1 (Indonesia) players
Victor Igbonefo
Persipura Jayapura players
Pelita Jaya FC players
Arema F.C. players
Victor Igbonefo
Victor Igbonefo
Victor Igbonefo
Victor Igbonefo
Persib Bandung players
Victor Igbonefo
Nigerian expatriate footballers
Nigerian expatriate sportspeople in Indonesia
Expatriate footballers in Indonesia
Indonesian expatriate footballers
Indonesian expatriate sportspeople in Thailand
Expatriate footballers in Thailand
Footballers at the 2014 Asian Games
Association football defenders
Asian Games competitors for Indonesia